Schwärze is a river of Brandenburg, Germany. It flows into the Finow Canal, which discharges into the Oder, in Eberswalde.

See also
List of rivers of Brandenburg

Rivers of Brandenburg
Rivers of Germany